Çukurköy can refer to:

 Çukurköy, Akseki
 Çukurköy, Hani
 Çukurköy, Havsa
 Çukurköy, İskilip
 Çukurköy, Yomra